Nikolay Dudkin (born 5 July 1947) is a Belarusian athlete. He competed in the men's triple jump at the 1968 Summer Olympics, representing the Soviet Union.

References

1947 births
Living people
Athletes (track and field) at the 1968 Summer Olympics
Belarusian male triple jumpers
Soviet male triple jumpers
Olympic athletes of the Soviet Union
Place of birth missing (living people)
Universiade silver medalists for the Soviet Union
Universiade medalists in athletics (track and field)
Medalists at the 1970 Summer Universiade
Athletes from Minsk